Charan may refer to:
Charan, a caste in India
Charan, Iran (disambiguation) - any of several places in Iran
The Charan subgroup of the Banjara people
Brohi Charan, a social group in Pakistan
The biblical place Haran